Ska jazz is a music genre derived by fusing the melodic content of jazz with the rhythmic and harmonic content of early Jamaican Music introduced by the "Fathers of Ska" in the late 1950s. The ska-jazz movement began during the 1990s in New York and London, where pioneering avant-garde jazz and reggae musicians pushed the boundaries of reggae music. They were combining traditions with modern tendencies, using the reggae beat along with high improvisation and jazz harmonies, primarily by horns and percussion.

Origins 
The term Ska-Jazz was coined by Rock Steady Freddie (Fred Reiter) of the New York Ska-Jazz Ensemble in 1994. Ska jazz is sometimes considered a subgenre of third wave ska, but early artists such as Tommy McCook considered themselves jazz musicians foremost. Before Rock Steady Freddie, Ska-Jazz was just another flare of jazz without its own name. Jazz improvisation is commonly used in Ska jazz. Ska Jazz bands usually contain one or two electric guitars, a bass guitar, keyboards, a drum kit and a horn section (composed of any combination of the following: trumpet, trombone, alto saxophone, tenor saxophone, and baritone saxophone). Occasionally there may be one or more vocalists, but the genre is primarily focused on instrumental tunes. The brass instruments usually carry the melody, and there are many improvised solos. The rhythm section places accents on the off beats, thus giving the music a different feel than straight jazz.

Ever since its birth in the late 1950s, ska has been a genre marked by physical and cultural diasporas and an openness to borrowing from outside its origins. The history of ska and jazz combined travels across national borders and integrates with other musical styles, making it one of the most hybrid, transnational forms of postwar popular music.

Early Jamaican Jazzmen 
The Skatalites
Tommy McCook
Roland Alphonso
Don Drummond
Ernest Ranglin
Jackie Mittoo

Notable artists 
Jazz Jamaica
The Orobians
Victor Rice
Rotterdam Ska-Jazz Foundation
Saint Petersburg Ska-Jazz Review
David Hillyard And The Rocksteady Seven
The Cat Empire
New York Ska-Jazz Ensemble
Tokyo Ska Paradise Orchestra
Melbourne Ska Orchestra
Quito Ska Jazz
Kingston Rudieska
Montréal Ska-Jazz Ensemble
The Articles
Satelite Kingston

Notes 

Jazz genres
Ska genres